Ikhwan raids may refer to several events during the Unification of Saudi Arabia campaign:
 Ikhwan's plunders on Kuwait, during the Kuwait-Najd Border War 1921
 Ikhwan raids on Transjordan 1922-1924
 Raids on Iraq and Kuwait during the Ikhwan Revolt (1927–1930)
Ikhwan raid on Busayya